The National Film Awards UK are presented in an annual award show hosted by the National Film Academy (NFA). As of 2015, it has taken place in Central London at the Porchester Hall. The 5th  National Film Awards UK was held on 27 March 2019.

History
The National Film Academy (NFA) was founded in 1999 and went on to launch the National Film Awards UK in 2015 as an annual awards ceremony celebrating the achievements of established and independent filmmakers, actors, actresses, casting directors, production companies, and crew who make up the motion picture industry. The National Film Awards is scheduled to produce four award ceremonies annually in the United Kingdom, United States, South America, Africa, and Australia. All nominations and voting for the NFA are submitted and voted for by movie fans, which is similar to the now-defunct award ceremony, the Daily Mail National Film Awards, that was held between 1946–1951.
National Film Academy has as its core mission to support, develop, promote and celebrate the achievements of the motion picture industry worldwide. The Academy has over 275,000 members worldwide and runs a year-round programme of premieres, festivals, seminars, conferences,  educational events including film screenings and tribute evenings.

Annual ceremony
The ceremony takes place annually in March. The awards are mostly open to all nationalities but all nominees or films must be based in the country of origin except the Best Foreign Film category.

Sponsorship
In 2016, the mobile network O2 sponsored the awards.

National Film Awards UK winners

2022  

 Best Actress: Kate Beckinsale (Jolt)
 Best Actor: Jude Law (Fantastic Beasts: The Secrets of Dumbledore)
 Best Newcomer: Olive Tennant (Belfast)
 Best Actress in a TV Series: Lily Collins (Emily in Paris)
 Best Actor in a TV Series: Ben Miller (Professor T.)
 Best Supporting Actress: Helen Mirren (The Duke)
 Best Supporting Actor: Mathew Horne (The Nan Movie)
 Best Drama: Save the Cinema
 Best Supporting Actress in a TV Series: Emma Naomi (Professor T.)
 Best Supporting Actor in a TV Series: Lucien Laviscount (Emily in Paris)
 Best TV Drama Series: Emily in Paris
 Best Thriller: Last Night in Soho
 Best Action in a Film/Series: Top Boy
 Best Independent Film: A Violent Man
 Best Screenplay: Stephen Brown, Marcelo Grion, Stephan Karandy (The Prototype)
 Best Documentary: The Tinder Swindler
 Best British Film: Belfast
 Best Comedy: People Just Do Nothing: Big in Japan
 Outstanding Performance: Craig Fairbrass (A Violent Man)
 Best Feature Film: Belfast
 Best Director: Martin Owen (Twist)
 Best Producer: Claire Jones, Tim Sealey (People Just Do Nothing: Big in Japan)
 Best Film Distribution Company: Vertigo Films
 Best Film Production Company: Darren Star Productions
 Best Foreign Language Film: Martín Barrenechea, Nicolás Branca (9)
 Best International Film: Citation
 Global Contribution to Motion Picture: Anthony Hopkins (The Father)
 Lifetime Achievement Award: Anita Dobson

2021 

 Best Animation Film: A Shaun the Sheep Movie: Farmageddon
 Best International Film: The Boy Who Harnessed the Wind
 Best Director: Shelagh McLeod (Astronaut)
 Best Actor: Adewale Akinnuoye-Agbaje (Farming)
 Best Actress: Kate Beckinsale (Farming)
 Best Newcomer: Mhairi Calvey
 Best Supporting Actress: Gemma Jones (Rocketman)
 Best Supporting Actor: Khali Best (Blue Story)
 Best Actress in a TV Series: T'Nia Miller (Years & Years)
 Best Actor in a TV Series: Mathew Horne (Gavin & Stacey)
 Best Drama: Farming
 Best TV Drama Series: Beecham House
 Best Thriller: The Haunting of Borley Rectory
 Best Action: Acceptable Damage
 Best Screenplay in a TV Series: Ricky Gervais (AfterLife)
 Best Independent Film:  Rise of the Footsoldier: Marbella
 Best Screenplay: Blue Story
 Best Documentary: Liam Gallagher: As It Was (Liam Gallagher, Gavin Fitzgerald, Charlie Lightening)
 Best British Film: Lynn + Lucy
 Best Comedy: Eaten by Lions
 Outstanding Performance: Louis Ashbourne Serkis (The Kid Who Would Be King)
 Best Feature Film: Lucas & Albert
 Best Producer: Ged Doherty, Elizabeth Fowler, Melissa Shiyu Zuo (Official Secrets)
 Best Film Distribution Company: Evolutionary films
 Best Film Production Company: Fable Pictures
 Best Foreign Language Film: Jessica Forever (France)
 Outstanding Achievement Award: Vanessa Redgrave
 Lifetime Achievement Award: Rowan Atkinson
 Global Contribution to Motion Picture: Rowan Atkinson

2019 
 Best Animation Film: Sherlock Gnomes
 Best International Film: Black Panther
 Global Contribution to Motion Picture: Michael Caine
 Best Director: Idris Elba (Yardie)
 Best Actor: Rupert Everett (The Happy Prince)
 Best Actress: Sophie Kennedy Clark (Obey)
 Best Newcomer: Justin Clarke (The Intent 2: The Come Up)
 Best Supporting Actress: Charlotte Milchard (Scott and Sid)
 Best Supporting Actor: Ricky Tomlinson (Gloves Off)
 Outstanding Contribution Award: Sylvia Young
 Best Drama: Yardie
 Best TV Drama Series: Collateral
 Best Thriller: Redcon-1
 Best Action: The Intent 2: The Come Up
 Best Independent Film: Dead Ringer
 Best Screenplay: 16/03
 Best Documentary: Bros: After the Screaming Stops
 Best British Film: Scott and Sid (Scott Elliott and Sid Sadowskyj)
 Best Comedy: The More You Ignore Me
 Best Breakthrough Performance: Justin Clarke (The Intent 2: The Come Up)
 Best Feature Film: Gloves Off
 Best Producer: Kristian Brodie (Beast)
 Best Film Distribution Company: Evolutionary Films
 Best Film Production Company: Carnaby International

2018 
 Best Actress: Alice Lowe (Prevenge)
 Best Newcomer: Daniel Kaluuya (Get Out)
 Best Supporting Actress: Jane Asher (Brian Pern: A Tribute)
 Best Supporting Actor: Robert Webb (Back)
 Best Drama: A Caribbean Dream
 Best TV Drama Series: The Cuckoo's Calling
 Best Thriller: Redwood
 Best Foreign Language Film: Mersal
 Best Action: Jawbone
 Best Independent Film: Rise of the Footsoldier 3
 Best Screenplay: Oliver Veysey (Access All Areas)
 Best Documentary: The Moving Theatre
 Best British Film: Kingsman: The Golden Circle
 Best Actor: Craig Fairbrass (Rise of the Footsoldier 3)
 Best Comedy: Brian Pern: A Tribute
 Best Breakthrough Performance: Johnny Harris ( Jawbone)
 Best Director: Matthew Vaughn (Kingsman: The Golden Circle)
 Best International Film: Get Out
 Global Contribution to Motion Picture: Tom Cruise
 Lifetime Achievement Award: Anna Sher

2017 
 Best International Film: American Honey
 Best Actor: Steven Brandon (My Feral Heart)
 Best Actress: Kate Dickie (Couple in a Hole)
 Best Breakthrough Performance in a Film: Jonathan Readwin (Stoner Express)
 Best Newcomer: Avin Manshadi
 Best Supporting Actress: Terry Pheto (A United Kingdom)
 Best Supporting Actor: Arnold Oceng (Brotherhood)
 Best Comedy: David Brent: Life on the Road
 Best Action: Brotherhood
 Best Drama: I, Daniel Blake
 Best Independent Feature: The Fall of the Krays
 Best Documentary: Britain's Billionaire Immigrants
 Best Thriller: Plan Z
 Best Screenplay: Andrea Arnold (American Honey)
 Best Short Film: Beverley
 Best British Film: A Street Cat Named Bob
 Best Director: Dexter Fletcher (Eddie the Eagle)
 Best Foreign Language Film: Neruda
 Global Contribution to Motion Picture: Simon Pegg
 Lifetime Achievement Award: Sir David Jason and Nicholas Lyndhurst

2016 
 Best International Film: Kingsman: The Secret Service
 Best Comedy: Man Up
 Best Action: Chasing Robert Barker
 Best Drama: A Reason to Leave
 Best Independent Feature: Never Let Go
 Best Documentary: The Hard Stop
 Best Thriller: Dartmoor Killing
 Best British Film: Rise of the Footsoldier II
 Best Actor: Tom Hiddleston (High-Rise)
 Best Actress: Nathalie Emmanuel (Furious 7)
 Best Director: Stephen Fingleton (The Survivalist)
 Best Screenplay: London Road
 Best Breakthrough Performance in a Film: John Boyega (Star Wars: The Force Awakens)
 Best Newcomer: Taron Egerton (Kingsman: The Secret Service)
 Best Foreign Language Film: Son of Saul
 Best Supporting Actress: Alexandra Evans (Redistributors)
 Best Supporting Actor: Samuel L. Jackson (Kingsman: The Secret Service)
 Best Short Film: Above
 Global Contribution to Motion Picture: Samuel L. Jackson

2015 

 Best Comedy: What We Did on Our Holiday
 Best Action: The Guvnors
 Best Drama: Belle
 Best Independent Feature: Abducted
 Best Documentary: Now: In The Wings On a World Stage
 Best Thriller: Black Sea
 Outstanding Achievement Award: Idris Elba
 Best Actress: Sameena Jabeen Ahmed
 Best Director: Amma Asante
 Best Screenplay: Electricity
 Best Newcomer: Harley Sylvester (The Guvnors)
 Best Short Film: Echo
 Best International Film: The Theory of Everything
 Best Actor: Benedict Cumberbatch (The Imitation Game)
 Best Breakthrough Performance: Gugu Mbatha-Raw (Belle)
 NFA Icon Award: Gemma Jones

In memoriam section

During the ceremony, National Film Awards UK pauses to pay tribute to those in the industry who died over the previous twelve months, with a montage of images accompanied by music. In 2016 the legendary late actor Alan Rickman was honored.

National Film Academy Honorary Awards
In 2015, Dame Judi Dench was voted by Academy members to receive the Lifetime Achievement Award, whilst the 2016 recipient of the Lifetime Achievement Award was Dame Helen Mirren. David Jason and Nicholas Lyndhurst were awarded the 2017 Lifetime Achievement Award, Anna Sher the 2018 award, and Rowan Atkinson the 2021 award.

Ceremonies

See also
 National Film Academy
 National Reality Television Awards
 Daily Mail National Film Awards
 British Academy Film Awards

References

External links
 National Film Awards UK official website

British film awards